Rinat Ibragimov may refer to:

 Rinat Ibragimov (ice hockey) (born 1986), Russian ice hockey player
 Rinat Ibragimov (judoka) (born 1986), Russian judoka
 Rinat Ibragimov (musician) (1960–2020), Russian musician